Villafana or Villafaña is a surname. Notable people with the surname include:

Ian Villafana (born 1957), American jazz guitarist
Jorge Villafaña (born 1989), American soccer player
Manny Villafaña (born 1940), American businessman
Percy Villafana, Trinidadian personality